Internet GIS, or Internet geographic information systems, is a term that refers to a broad set of technologies and applications that employ the Internet to access, analyze, visualize, and distribute spatial data.

Introduction

Internet GIS is an outgrowth of traditional geographic information systems or GIS, and represents a paradigm shift from conducting GIS on an individual computer to working with remotely distributed data and functions. Two major issues in GIS are accessing and distributing spatial data and GIS outputs. Internet GIS helps to solve that problem by allowing users to access vast databases impossible to store on a single desktop computer, and by allowing rapid dissemination of both maps and raw data to others. These methods include both file sharing and email. This has enabled the general public to participate in map creation and make use of GIS technology.

Internet GIS is a subset of Distributed GIS, but specifically uses the internet rather than generic computer networks. Internet GIS applications are often, but not exclusively, conducted through the World Wide Web (also known as the Web), giving rise to the sub-branch of Web GIS, often used interchangeably with Internet GIS.

Internet GIS includes services beyond those enabled by the Web. Use of any other internet-enabled services to facilitate GIS functions, even if used in conjuncture with the Web, represents the use of Internet GIS. One of the most common applications of a distributed GIS system, accessing remotely saved data, can be done through the internet without the need for the Web. This is often done in practice when data are sensitive, such as hospital patient data and research facilities proprietary data, where sending data through the Web may be a security risk. This can be done using a Virtual private network (VPN) to access a local network remotely. The use of VPN for these purposes serged during the COVID-19 pandemic, when employers needed to allow employees using GIS access to sensitive spatial data from home.

History
The history of Internet geographic information systems is linked to the history of the computer, the internet, and the quantitative revolution in geography. Geography tends to adapt technologies from other disciplines rather than innovating and inventing the technologies employed to conduct geographic studies. The computer and internet are not an exception, and were rapidly investigated to purpose towards the needs of geographers. In 1959, Waldo Tobler published the first paper detailing the use of computers in map creation. This was the beginning of computer cartography, or the use of computers to create maps. In 1960, the first true geographic information system capable of storing, analyzing, changing, and creating visualizations with spatial data was created by Roger Tomlinson on behalf of the Canadian Government to manage natural resources. These technologies represented a paradigm shift in cartography and geography, with desktop computer cartography facilitated through GIS rapidly replaced traditional ways of making maps. The emergence of GIS and computer technology contributed to the quantitative revolution in geography and the emergence of the branch of technical geography.

As computer technology advanced the desktop machine became the default for producing maps, a process known as digital mapping, or computer cartography. These computers were networked together to share data and processing power and create redundant communications for defense applications. This computer network evolved into the internet, and by the late 1980s, the internet was available in some people's homes. Over time, the internet moved from a novelty to a major part of daily life. Using the internet, it was no longer necessary to store all data for a project locally, and communications were vastly improved. Following this trend, GIScientists began developing methods for combining the internet and GIS. This process accelerated in the 1990s, with the creation of the World Wide Web in 1990 and the first major web mapping program, Xerox PARC Map Viewer, capable of distributed map creation appearing in 1993. This software was unique in that it facilitated dynamic user map generation, rather than static images. These new Web-based programs helped users to employ GIS without having it locally installed on their machine, ultimately leading to Web GIS being the dominant way users interact with internet GIS.

In 1995 The US federal government made the TIGER Mapping Service available to the public, facilitating desktop and Web GIS by hosting US boundary data. This data availability, facilitated through the internet, silently revolutionized cartography by providing the world with authoritative boundary files, for free. In 1996, MapQuest became available to the public, facilitating navigation and trip planning. Sometime during the 1990s, more maps were transmitted over the internet then physically printed. This milestone was predicted in 1985, and represented a major shift in how we distribute spatial products to the masses.

Web GIS 

The World Wide Web is an information system that uses the internet to host, share, and distribute documents, images, and other data. Web GIS involves using the World Wide Web to facilitate GIS tasks traditionally done on a desktop computer, as well as enabling the sharing of maps and spatial data. Most, but not all, internet GIS is Web GIS, however all Web GIS is internet GIS. This is quite similar to how much of the activity on the internet is hosted on the World Wide Web, but not everything on the internet is the World Wide Web. Web GIS  The tasks Web GIS are used for are numerous but can be generally divided into the categories of Geospatial web services:  web feature services, web processing services, and web mapping services.

Mobile GIS

Cell phones and other wireless communication forms have become common in society. Many of these devices are connected to the internet and can access internet GIS applications like any other computer. These devices are networked together, using technology such as the mobile web.  Unlike traditional computers, however, these devices generate immense amounts of spatial data available to the device user and many governments and private entities. The tools, applications, and hardware used to facilitate GIS through the use of wireless technology is mobile GIS. Used by the holder of the device, mobile GIS enables navigation applications like Google Maps to help the user navigate to a location. When used by private firms, the location data collected can help businesses understand foot traffic in an area to optimize business practices. Governments can use this data to monitor citizens. Access to locational data by third parties has led to privacy concerns. 

Mobile GIS is a subset of distributed GIS, and has a significant overlap with internet GIS, however not all mobile GIS employs the internet, much less the mobile web. Thus, the categories are distinct.

Criticism

By their definition, maps can never be perfect and are simplifications of reality. Ethical cartographers try to keep these inaccuracies documented and to a minimum, while encouraging critical perspectives when using a map. Internet GIS has brought map-making tools to the general public, facilitating the rapidly disseminating these maps. While this is potentially positive, it also means that people without cartographic training can easily make and disseminate misleading maps to a wide audience. Further, malicious actors can quickly spread intentionally misleading spatial information while hiding the source.

For many users, the World Wide Web is synonymous with the Internet, which is true for Internet GIS. Most functions done with Internet GIS are conducted through the use of Web GIS. This has caused the borders between the two terms to blur, and "Web GIS" to become genericized into meaning any GIS done over the internet to some users.

See also 

 AM/FM/GIS
 At-location mapping
 Collaborative mapping
 Comparison of GIS software
 Concepts and Techniques in Modern Geography
 Counter-mapping
 CyberGIS
 Digital geologic mapping
 GIS Day
 Historical GIS
 Integrated Geo Systems
 List of GIS data sources
 List of GIS software
 Map database management
 Participatory GIS
 Quantitative geography
 Spatial neural network
 Technical geography
 Tobler's first law of geography
 Tobler's second law of geography
 Traditional knowledge GIS

References

Internet Geographic information systems